Ematheudes varicella is a species of snout moth in the genus Ematheudes. It was described by Émile Louis Ragonot in 1887, and is known from Armenia and Turkistan.

References

Moths described in 1887
Anerastiini
Insects of Turkey